Forest gardening is a low-maintenance, sustainable, plant-based food production and agroforestry system based on woodland ecosystems, incorporating fruit and nut trees, shrubs, herbs, vines and perennial vegetables which have yields directly useful to humans. Making use of companion planting, these can be intermixed to grow in a succession of layers to build a woodland habitat.
Forest gardening is a prehistoric method of securing food in tropical areas. In the 1980s, Robert Hart coined the term "forest gardening" after adapting the principles and applying them to temperate climates.

History
Since prehistoric times hunter-gatherers might have influenced forests, for instance in Europe by Mesolithic people bringing favored plants like hazel with them. Forest gardens are probably the world's oldest form of land use and most resilient agroecosystem. They originated in prehistoric times along jungle-clad river banks and in the wet foothills of monsoon regions. In the gradual process of families improving their immediate environment, useful tree and vine species were identified, protected and improved whilst undesirable species were eliminated. Eventually superior foreign species were selected and incorporated into the gardens. First Nation villages in Alaska with forest gardens, that were filled with nuts, stone fruit, berries, and herbs, were noted by an archeologist from the Smithsonian in the 1930s.

These are also called agroforests and, where the wood components are short-statured, the term shrub garden is employed. Forest gardens have been shown to be a significant source of income and food security for local populations.

Robert Hart adapted forest gardening for the United Kingdom's temperate climate during the 1980s. His theories were later developed by Martin Crawford from the Agroforestry Research Trust and various permaculturalists such as Graham Bell, Patrick Whitefield, Dave Jacke and Geoff Lawton.

In temperate climates

Hart began farming at Wenlock Edge in Shropshire with the intention of providing a healthy and therapeutic environment for himself and his brother Lacon. Starting as relatively conventional smallholders, Hart soon discovered that maintaining large annual vegetable beds, rearing livestock and taking care of an orchard were tasks beyond their strength. However, a small bed of perennial vegetables and herbs he planted was looking after itself with little intervention.

Following Hart's adoption of a raw vegan diet for health and personal reasons, he replaced his farm animals with plants. The three main products from a forest garden are fruit, nuts and green leafy vegetables. He created a model forest garden from a 0.12 acre (500 m2) orchard on his farm and intended naming his gardening method ecological horticulture or ecocultivation. Hart later dropped these terms once he became aware that agroforestry and forest gardens were already being used to describe similar systems in other parts of the world. He was inspired by the forest farming methods of Toyohiko Kagawa and James Sholto Douglas, and the productivity of the Keralan home gardens; as Hart explained, "From the agroforestry point of view, perhaps the world's most advanced country is the Indian state of Kerala, which boasts no fewer than three and a half million forest gardens ... As an example of the extraordinary intensity of cultivation of some forest gardens, one plot of only  was found by a study group to have twenty-three young coconut palms, twelve cloves, fifty-six bananas, and forty-nine pineapples, with thirty pepper vines trained up its trees. In addition, the smallholder grew fodder for his house-cow."

Seven-layer system

Robert Hart pioneered a system based on the observation that the natural forest can be divided into distinct levels.

He used intercropping to develop an existing small orchard of apples and pears into an edible polyculture landscape consisting of the following layers:

‘Canopy layer’ consisting of the original mature fruit trees.
‘Low-tree layer’ of smaller nut and fruit trees on dwarfing rootstocks.
‘Shrub layer’ of fruit bushes such as currants and berries.
‘Herbaceous layer’ of perennial vegetables and herbs.
‘Rhizosphere’ or ‘underground’ dimension of plants grown for their roots and tubers.
‘Ground cover layer’ of edible plants that spread horizontally.
‘Vertical layer’ of vines and climbers.

A key component of the seven-layer system was the plants he selected. Most of the traditional vegetable crops grown today, such as carrots, are sun-loving plants not well selected for the more shady forest garden system. Hart favored shade-tolerant perennial vegetables.

Further development
The Agroforestry Research Trust, managed by Martin Crawford, runs experimental forest gardening projects on a number of plots in Devon, United Kingdom. Crawford describes a forest garden as a low-maintenance way of sustainably producing food and other household products.

Ken Fern had the idea that for a successful temperate forest garden a wider range of edible shade tolerant plants would need to be used. To this end, Fern created the organisation Plants for a Future which compiled a plant database suitable for such a system. Fern used the term woodland gardening, rather than forest gardening, in his book Plants for a Future.

Kathleen Jannaway, the cofounder of Movement for Compassionate Living (MCL) with her husband Jack, wrote a book outlining a sustainable vegan future called Abundant Living in the Coming Age of the Tree in 1991. The MCL promotes forest gardening and other types of vegan organic gardening. In 2009 it provided a grant of £1,000 to the Bangor Forest Garden project in Gwynedd, North West Wales.

Kevin Bradley in the US called his property and nursery "Edible Forest" in 1985, which combined trees and field crops. Today, his business and the 2005 book Edible Forest Gardens have spawned little "edible forests" all over the world.

Permaculture
Bill Mollison, who coined the term permaculture, visited Robert Hart at his forest garden in Wenlock Edge in October 1990. Hart's seven-layer system has since been adopted as a common permaculture design element.

Numerous permaculturalists are proponents of forest gardens, or food forests, such as Graham Bell, Patrick Whitefield, Dave Jacke, Eric Toensmeier and Geoff Lawton. Bell started building his forest garden in 1991 and wrote the book The Permaculture Garden in 1995, Whitefield wrote the book How to Make a Forest Garden in 2002, Jacke and Toensmeier co-authored the two volume book set Edible Forest Gardens in 2005, and Lawton presented the film Establishing a Food Forest in 2008.

In tropical climates
Forest gardens, or home gardens, are common in the tropics, using intercropping to cultivate trees, crops, and livestock on the same land. In Kerala in south India as well as in northeastern India, the home garden is the most common form of land use and is also found in Indonesia. One example combines coconut, black pepper, cocoa and pineapple. These gardens exemplify polyculture, and conserve much crop genetic diversity and heirloom plants that are not found in monocultures. Forest gardens have been loosely compared to the religious concept of the Garden of Eden.

Americas
The BBC's Unnatural Histories claimed that the Amazon rainforest, rather than being a pristine wilderness, has been shaped by humans for at least 11,000 years through practices such as forest gardening and terra preta. Since the 1970s, numerous geoglyphs have been discovered on deforested land in the Amazon rainforest, furthering the evidence of pre-Columbian civilizations.

On the Yucatán Peninsula, much of the Maya food supply was grown in "orchard gardens", known as pet kot. The system takes its name from the low wall of stones (pet meaning 'circular' and kot, 'wall of loose stones') that characteristically surrounds the gardens.

Africa
In many African countries, for example Zambia, Zimbabwe, Ethiopia and Tanzania, gardens are widespread in rural, periurban, and urban areas and they play an essential role in establishing food security. Most well known are the Chaga or Chagga gardens on the slopes of Mount Kilimanjaro in Tanzania. These are an example of an agroforestry system. In many countries, women are the main actors in home gardening and food is mainly produced for subsistence. In North Africa, oasis-layered gardening with palm trees, fruit trees, and vegetables is a traditional type of forest garden.

Plants
Some plants, such as wild yam, work as both a root plant and a vine. Ground covers are low-growing edible 'forest garden plants that help keep weeds in control and provide a way to utilize areas that would otherwise be unused.

Plants 
 Cardamom
 Ginger
 Chervil
 Bergamot
 Sweet woodruff
 Sweet cicely

Projects
El Pilar on the Belize–Guatemala border features a forest garden to demonstrate traditional Maya agricultural practices. A further one acre model forest garden, called Känan K’aax (meaning 'well-tended garden' in Mayan), is funded by the National Geographic Society and developed at Santa Familia Primary School in Cayo.

In the United States, the largest known food forest on public land is believed to be the seven acre Beacon Food Forest in Seattle, Washington. Other forest garden projects include those at the central Rocky Mountain Permaculture Institute in Basalt, Colorado, and Montview Neighborhood farm in Northampton, Massachusetts. The Boston Food Forest Coalition promotes local forest gardens.

In Canada Richard Walker has been developing and maintaining food forests in British Columbia for over 30 years. He developed a three-acre food forest that at maturity provided raw materials for a plant nursery and herbal business as well as food for his family. The Living Centre has developed various forest garden projects in Ontario.

In the United Kingdom, other than those run by the Agroforestry Research Trust (ART), there are numerous forest garden projects such as the Bangor Forest Garden in Gwynedd, northwest Wales. Martin Crawford from ART administers the Forest Garden Network, an informal network of people and organisations who are cultivating forest gardens.

Since 2014, Gisela Mir and Mark Biffen have been developing a small-scale edible forest garden ( in Catalan) in Cardedeu, a village near Barcelona, Catalunya. During their previous years of permaculture training they were introduced to various edible forest garden projects in Wales and other parts of the UK. It is intended as a space for experimentation and demonstration: "...we want to learn and test what it means to have an orchard in an area with a Mediterranean climate: which species grow well here; how to manage limiting aspects, such as water; and, above all, what design implications there are due to the characteristics of our climate and our latitude."  In April 2021, they published in Spanish the book Food forests and edible gardens, where they draw on their first experimental progresses and experiences, delving into the particularities of the Mediterranean climate through a book adapted to that climate and to those species. It is one of the first works on this subject not written in English.

See also

 Agroecology
 Analog forestry
 Climate-friendly gardening
 Deep ecology
 Forest farming
 Gardening
 Hügelkultur
 List of companion plants
 Multiple cropping
 Mycoforestry
 Natural farming
 Nutrient cycle
 Orchard
 Pekarangan, the gardens of "complete design", in Java
 Polyculture
 Vegan organic gardening

Notes

References
Bukowski, C. & Munsell, J. 2018. "The Community Food Forest Handbook: How to Plan, Organize, and Nurture Edible Gathering Places". Chelsea Green Publishing.. pp. 83–86
Crawford, Martin 2010. Creating a Forest Garden: Working with Nature to Grow Edible Crops. Totnes: Green Books. .
d'Arms, Deborha 2011. Jardin d’Or (Garden of Gold): A Treatise on Forest Gardening, Recreating Sustainable Gardens of Eden. Los Gatos, CA: Robertson Publishing. .
Douglas, J. Sholto and Hart, Robert A. de J. 1985. Forest Farming. Intermediate Technology. .
Fern, Ken 1997. Plants for a Future: Edible and Useful Plants for a Healthier World. Hampshire: Permanent Publications. .
Hart, Robert A. de J. 1996b. Beyond the Forest Garden. Gaia Books. .
Jacke, Dave, and Toensmeier, Eric 2005. Edible Forest Gardens. Two volume set. Volume One: Ecological Vision and Theory for Temperate Climate Permaculture, . Volume Two: Ecological Design and Practice for Temperate Climate Permaculture, . White River Junction, VT: Chelsea Green.
Jannaway, Kathleen 1991. Abundant Living in the Coming Age of the Tree. Movement for Compassionate Living. .
Smith, Joseph Russell 1988 (first published in 1929). Tree Crops: A Permanent Agriculture. Island Press. 
Whitefield, P. 2002. How to Make a Forest Garden. Hampshire: Permanent Publications. .
Mir, Gisela Biffen, Mark 2021. Bosques y jardines de alimentos. La Fertilidad de la Tierra Ediciones. (in Spanish) ISBN 978-84-121830-1-6

External links

Why Food Forests?, Permaculture Research Institute
Plant an Edible Forest Garden, Mother Earth News
The garden of the future?, The Guardian
Forest gardens, Permaculture Association
El Pilar Forest Garden Network, information on traditional Maya forest gardening

Agroforestry

de:Permakultur#Waldgarten